The R607 road is a regional road in County Cork, Ireland. It travels from the N71 road to Kinsale.

References

Regional roads in the Republic of Ireland
Roads in County Cork